Kiki Bertens was the defending champion and successfully defended her title, defeating Barbora Krejčíková in the final, 6–2, 6–1.

Seeds

Draw

Finals

Top half

Bottom half

Qualifying

Seeds

Qualifiers

Lucky loser
  Julia Glushko

Draw

First qualifier

Second qualifier

Third qualifier

Fourth qualifier

Fifth qualifier

Sixth qualifier

References 
 Main draw
 Qualifying draw

Nurnberger Versicherungscup Singles
2017 Singles
Nurnberger Versicherungscup Singles